The Willapa River is a river on the Pacific coast of southwestern Washington in the United States, approximately  long. It drains an area of low hills and a coastal plain into Willapa Bay, a large estuary north of the mouth of the Columbia River.

It flows northwest in a winding course past the small communities of Willapa and Raymond. It enters the northwest end of Willapa Bay at South Bend.

Name
The name is that of the Willapa people, an Athapaskan-speaking people, now extinct, who occupied the valley of the river and also the prairies between the headwaters of the Chehalis and Cowlitz Rivers.

See also
List of rivers of Washington

References

Rivers of Washington (state)
Rivers of Pacific County, Washington